Reindel is a surname. Notable people with the surname include:

Carl Reindel (1935–2009), American actor
Edna Reindel (1894–1990), American painter, printmaker, illustrator, sculptor, muralist and teacher
Friedrich Reindel (1824–1908), Royal Prussian executioner

See also
Cahill Gordon & Reindel

Surnames from given names